Yorkton was a territorial electoral district in the Northwest Territories from 1894 - 1905,
After 1905 when Saskatchewan split from the territories, the district of Yorkton continues to exist to present day.

The riding was named after the city of Yorkton, Saskatchewan.

By-election reasons
October 26, 1897 Not available

See also
 Yorkton Saskatchewan provincial electoral district
 Yorkton Federal electoral district

Former electoral districts of Northwest Territories